Guilbeault is a surname of French origin derived from the German name Willibald. It is mostly used among French Canadians while it is quite rare in France.

 Luce Guilbeault (1935–1991), Canadian actress
 Steven Guilbeault (born 1970), Canadian environment minister

Surnames of French origin